Max Wehrli (17 September 1909 – 18 December 1998) was a Swiss literary scholar and Germanist. Wehrli studied from 1928 till 1935 Germanic and Greek at the Universities of Zurich and Berlin. Among his teachers were Emil Ermatinger, Ernst Howald and Nicolai Hartmann. 1936 he wrote his Ph.D. thesis at the University of Zurich.

Since 1953 Max Wehrli was tenured professor for the history of German literature at Zurich. 1955 he was visiting professor at the Columbia University in New York City.

Awards
1979 Prix Gottfried Keller

Works
 Johann Jakob Bodmer und die Geschichte der Literatur. Zürich, Phil. I Sekt., Diss. Frauenfeld, Leipzig 1936.
 Das barocke Geschichtsbild in Lohensteins Arminius. Frauenfeld, Leipzig 1938.
 Allgemeine Literaturwissenschaft. Bern 1951.
 Gottfried Kellers Verhältnis zum eigenen Schaffen. Basel 1963.
 Formen mittelalterlicher Erzählung: Aufsätze. Zürich 1969.
 Geschichte der deutschen Literatur von den Anfängen bis zum Ende des 16. Jahrhunderts. Stuttgart 1980.
 Literatur im deutschen Mittelalter: eine poetologische Einführung. Stuttgart 1984.

Germanists
Academic staff of the University of Zurich
1909 births
1998 deaths